Seatown is a coastal hamlet in Dorset, England, on the English Channel approximately  west-southwest of Bridport. It lies within the civil parish of Chideock.

The surrounding area is also designated part of the Dorset Area of Outstanding Natural Beauty.

Seatown comprises a small number of houses, a holiday park, some holiday cottages and The Anchor pub. The small River Winniford or Wynreford runs into the sea here. Seatown beach is popular with fossil collectors, with rock of Late Jurassic/Early Cretaceous. The beach is privately owned; it is free to access but parking is charged.

'Furmity'—a mix of wheat, dried fruit and sugar, often with added spirits—was one of the products sold at a Whit Monday Fair which used to be held in Seatown. In Thomas Hardy's 1886 novel The Mayor of Casterbridge, the character Michael Henchard got drunk on laced furmity and sold his wife while inebriated.

Notable residents
Hugh Stoker, angling author

References

External links
 Seatown (Dorset) Fossils Discovering Fossils.
 Dorset Beaches: West Dorset: Seatown Dorset Beaches. Newsquest Media Group.

Beaches of Dorset
Populated coastal places in Dorset
Jurassic Coast